Pericotoxodon is an extinct genus of toxodontid notoungulate, from the Miocene period. Fossils of Pericotoxodon were found near Río Inuya and Mapuya in Peru, and in La Venta, Colombia and Bolivia, in deposits dated to the Middle Miocene.

Etymology  
The genus name, Pericotoxodon, is derived from "Perico",  which was named after  José Espíritu Pericó, who discovered the holotype in the La Gaviota locality from the Villavieja Formation of Colombia.

References

Toxodonts
Miocene mammals of South America
Neogene Peru
Fossils of Peru
Neogene Colombia
Fossils of Colombia
Laventan
Honda Group, Colombia
Fossil taxa described in 1895
Prehistoric placental genera